Gerardo Sebastián Gularte Fros (born May 21, 1990, in Tacuarembó, Uruguay) is an Uruguayan footballer currently playing for Atletico Bucaramanga of the Primera División in Colombia.

Teams 
  Tacuarembó FC 2009–2010
  Deportivo Maldonado 2010–2011
  Tacuarembó FC 2012–2013
  Rampla Juniors 2014
  Montevideo Wanderers 2014–2015
  San Marcos de Arica 2015
  Progreso 2016
  Miramar Misiones 2017
  Tacuarembó F.C. 2018
  Union Comercio 2019
  Deportivo Binacional 2020
  Nacional Potosi 2021
  Atlético Bucaramanga 2022

References 
 
 Sebastián Gularte at playmakerstats.com (English version of ceroacero.es)
 

1990 births
Living people
People from Tacuarembó Department
Uruguayan footballers
Uruguayan expatriate footballers
Tacuarembó F.C. players
Rampla Juniors players
Deportivo Maldonado players
Montevideo Wanderers F.C. players
San Marcos de Arica footballers
Chilean Primera División players
Expatriate footballers in Chile
Association football forwards